César Alfredo "Amigó" Aguilar (born August 23, 1981) is a Mexican film producer, screenwriter, director, cinematographer, actor, and founder of Oscuro Deseo Producciones. He is known as the creator of the film series Serial Comic, and as a screenwriter of the shortfilms Sesiones and the critically acclaimed Un aliado en el tiempo (An ally in time). He is also a make-up artist known for his work on Sus satánicas majestades.

Career
Amigó's first job in the movie business was when he was 18 and worked as a PA for producer Cecilia Sagredo's Mœnia music video No dices más. During his sophomore year at college, he teamed with Miguel A. Reina to write a feature film treatment, the treatment was the basis for Sesiones. Amigó's first produced shortfilm, which starred Omar Zurita and Mónica Galván. He followed that up with Mi vida en frenesí, starring Josefina Gómez Maganda, and Reflexiones.

Amigó collaborated with producer Heissel Domínguez on the 2008 film, Un aliado en el tiempo. Next year, he made his first foray into television with Capadocia, which was broadcast on HBO, serving as the show's co-cinematographer (with Alberto Anaya and Martín Boege). Under his production company, Oscuro Deseo Producciones, Amigó wrote and directed Serial Comic No.1: Fijación, prelude to film series Serial Comic. He also served as make-up artist of Sergio García Michel's Sus satánicas majestades and actor in Sergio Tovar Velarde's Infinito. On the other hand, Amigó has photographed various shortfilms for many film directors.

Amigó's unknown skill is acting, contribute in the past in many film and TV projects, including Richard Shepard's The Matador, Russell Mulcahy's Resident Evil: Extinction and Pete Travis's Vantage Point, among others.

Amigós worked in the Gustavo Alatriste's project Detrás de la luna (Behind the moon).

Actually is Working in Vidas en Movimiento / Life in Motion

Filmography
Fuera De Señal (2015) (creative Director)
Plastik Lub (2014) (assistant director)
Amor Maternal (2014) (assistant director)
Mexico Barbaro (2014) (assistant director)
The ABC Of Death (2013) (Casting)
Cuatro Lunas (2013) (Producer)
Z: The Definitive Documentary (2011) (director, cinematographer)
Lucha Verde: Super Verde vs La contaminación (2010) (director, writer)
Afuera (2010) (assistant director)
Infinito (2010) (make-up artist)
Serial Comic No.1: Fijación (2010) (director, writer)
Seguro de vida (2010) (assistant director, assistant cinematographer)
Los inadaptados (2010) (actor)
Sus satánicas majestades (2009) (cinematographer, make-up artist)
Un pedazo de Guerrero en el D.F. (2009) (producer)
Siempre fiel (2009) (cinematographer)
Un aliado en el tiempo (2008) (writer, producer)
Vantage Point (2008) (actor)
Reflexiones (2008) (editor)
Un hermano (2007) (cinematographer)
Resident Evil: Extinction (2007) (actor)
Mi vida con frenesí (2007) (cinematographer, editor)
The Matador (2005) (actor)
Sesiones (2000) (director, writer)

Television
Bitácora Insólita (2016-2018) (productor)
Capadocia (2009) (cinematographer)
La vida es una canción (2004) (actor)
La Heredera (2004) (actor)

Music videos
Ursula Kempt's Cobarde  (2013) (production assistant)
Evanoff's Dogma  (2013) (production assistant)
Torre Blanca's Lobo  (2012) (production assistant)
Mœnia's No dices más  (1999) (production assistant)
Mario Mordan's Piensa otra vez (1999) (director, writer)

Trivia
Has written many horror tales for local competition.

References

External links 
 
  Oscuro Deseo Official Site

1981 births
Living people
Mexican film directors
Mexican film producers
Mexican male screenwriters
People from Mexico City
Spanish-language film directors